Kaidu (1185–1241) was leader of the Mongol House of Ögedei and de facto khan of the Chagatai Khanate.

Kaidu may also refer to:

Kaidu (11th century), Mongol ruler of the Borjigin Clan
Kaidu, Iran, a village
Kaidu River, Xinjiang Uyghur Autonomous Region, China
Epp Kaidu (1915-1976), Soviet and Estonian theatre director and actress

See also